Larry Mondello is a fictional character from the iconic American television series Leave It to Beaver (1957–1963). He is portrayed by child actor Robert "Rusty" Stevens. Larry Mondello appears in 68 of the show's 234 episodes over the first few seasons. Although Larry is mentioned in the premiere episode, "Beaver Gets 'Spelled", it is not until the eighth episode, "Beaver's Crush", that he actually makes an appearance.

Description

Larry is Theodore "Beaver" Cleaver's chubby, not very bright classmate and best friend distinguished for his apple-eating, candy bar-munching habits. Larry has a knack for leading Beaver astray and getting him into trouble.

Larry's mother, Margaret (portrayed by Madge Blake), is a nervous, exasperated parent, whose husband is so perennially  out-of-town on business, the phrase "If your father were home . . ." comes out of her mouth, at some point, in almost every episode in which she appears. Mrs. Mondello sometimes takes Larry to Beaver's father for discipline. Larry's father makes one brief appearance, however; he is seen talking to Larry backstage in the second-season episode, "School Play". Larry has older siblings, including a married brother and an unmarried, unseen, and unattractive (according to Larry) 18-year-old sister (age mentioned in the 3rd season) and a little brother mentioned in the 1958 episode, "Beaver & Henry", who live at home. In one episode, Mrs. Mondello catches Larry and Beaver reading Larry's sister's diary. Reports from various characters on the show indicate Larry's home life is one of "hollering" and physical punishments.

Larry and Beaver have an on-again/off-again relationship. The boys sometimes quarrel but make up when the clouds pass. They are in the same class together at Grant Avenue Grammar School and are forced to attend ballroom dance lessons at Miss Spencer's School of the Dance on Saturdays. In the first-season episode "Beaver's Short Pants", Larry taunts Beaver at school for having "girl's stockings" and calls him a "sissy" for wearing a formal short pants suit with kneesocks, provoking Beaver to punch Larry in the stomach. Larry runs away from home in one episode — but only as far as Beaver's bathroom where he sleeps in the bath tub. In another episode, Larry throws his mother's pin money out the window, picks it up later, and claims the money fell from an airplane.

Actor Stevens left the show when his family moved from Burbank, California, to Philadelphia, Pennsylvania, a move which brought Stevens's acting career to an end. According to Barbara Billingsley (in her TV Archive interview), his character was written out because of his overly ambitious stage mother causing grief with the producers. Stevens reprised his role of Larry Mondello in the 1983 reunion telemovie, Still the Beaver.

References
Applebaum, Irwyn. The World According to Beaver. TV Books, 1984, 1998..
Bank, Frank. Call Me Lumpy: my Leave It To Beaver days and other wild Hollywood life . Addax, 2002.,.  
Colella, Jennifer. The Leave It to Beaver Guide to Life: wholesome wisdom from the Cleavers! Running Press, 2006.,.
Leave It to Beaver: the complete first season. Universal Studios, 2005.
Leave It to Beaver: the complete second season. Universal Studios, 2006.
Mathers, Jerry. ...And Jerry Mathers as "The Beaver". Berkley Boulevard Books, 1998.

Television characters introduced in 1957
Leave It to Beaver characters
Male characters in television
Child characters in television